Kuttey is a 2023 Indian Hindi-language action thriller film directed by Aasmaan Bhardwaj, in his directorial debut. It is produced by Vishal Bhardwaj Films, T-Series Films and Luv Films. The film stars an ensemble cast of Tabu, Arjun Kapoor, Naseeruddin Shah, Radhika Madan, Konkona Sen Sharma, Kumud Mishra and Shardul Bhardwaj. 

It was theatrically released on 13 January 2023. It began to stream on Netflix from 16th March 2023.

Plot
One rainy night in the outskirts of Mumbai, three stray gangs unknowingly cross paths on the hunt for a van carrying crores of cash and it's every man for himself.

Cast
 Tabu as Poonam Sandhu aka Pammi
 Arjun Kapoor as Gopal Tiwari
 Naseeruddin Shah as Narayan Khobre
 Konkona Sen Sharma as Lakshmi Sharma
 Radhika Madan as Lovely Khobre, Narayan's daughter
 Kumud Mishra as Viswapal Suri aka Paaji
 Shardul Bhardwaj as Danny Dandekar
 Lavishka Gupta as Gopal's Daughter
 Ashish Vidyarthi as Harry
 Vijayant Kohli as Mamu
 Jay Upadhyay as Surti
 Santosh Juvekar as Police Inspector
 Anurag Kashyap as Politician
 Vijay Kumar Singh as Shankar
 Jagbir Singh Pannu as Police Inspector
 Aasmaan Bhardwaj as Rajiv Mishra
 Brij Gopal as Manohar
 Ashwini Mishra as Commissioner Of Police
 Ajit Shidhaye as Jehangir
 Narendra Modi as Himself

Soundtrack 

The music of the film is composed by Vishal Bhardwaj. The lyrics are penned by Gulzar & Faiz Ahmad Faiz.

Reception 
Kuttey received positive reviews from critics for its performances (particularly Tabu's) screenplay and background score.

Monika Rawal Kukreja of Hindustan Times wrote, "It's a one-time watch and if nothing else, enjoy the music." Ronak Kotecha of Times Of India rated the film 3.5 out of 5 stars and wrote, "Kuttey starts off with a bang and keeps powering its screenplay with interestingly dark, sharp and self-centred characters". He added "it's easy to pick your favourite. Tabu tops the list her pitch is perfect and appears effortless, Kapoor has more to do, and the actor delivers an honest performance while Naseeruddin Shah, Konkana, Radhika, Shardul and Kumud make their limited time on screen count". 

Zinia Bandyopadhyay of India Today rated the film 3 out of 5 stars and wrote, "Kuttey is best enjoyed if you have a knack for dark and wry humour. However, if gore is not your cup of tea, it is best to steer clear from this one. The performances are indeed the strong suit in the film Mishra and Kapoor both will leave you impressed, Tabu, steals the show, Madan is delight to watch, Naseerudin and Konkona’s extended cameo, sets the mood wish they had more screen time". Avinash Lohana of Pinkvilla rated the film 3 out of 5 stars and wrote, "Kuttey does entertain and enthral, but in parts. The film was capable of a lot more and doesn’t optimise its potential. Kapoor gives a sincere performance, Tabu, Konkona, Kumud delivered controlled performance which leaves an impact, Radhika and Shardul shine in their respective roles".

Bollywood Hungama rated the film 3 out of 5 stars and wrote, "Kuttey rests on an interesting concept and strong performances but suffers from excessive violence and usage of cuss words". Saibal Chatterjee of NDTV rated the film 3 out of 5 stars and wrote, "Kuttey is a film that certainly does not bark up the wrong tree. On performances she highlighted Tabu's work, who delivers unblemished performance, and admirably supported well by Mishra, Kapoor, Madan and Bharadwaj go along with the flow of the wild tale without missing a beat, while Naseeruddin Shah and Konkona Sen do full justice to their limited roles". Anna M. M. Vetticad of Firstpost rated it 2 out of 5 stars and wrote, "Kuttey needed some meat to bark. The film doesn’t have a very convincing storyline the unnecessary violence, use of cuss words and a huge waste of some good craftsmen".

References

External links
 

2023 action thriller films
Indian action thriller films